The Beauceron is a herding dog breed originating from the plains of Central France. The Beauceron is also known as Berger de Beauce (sheepdog from Beauce) or  Bas Rouge (red-stockings).

History

A French herding breed known for centuries in western Europe, the Beauceron is noted as one of the breeds used to create the Doberman Pinscher. Although quite different in appearance, the Beauceron and the long-haired sheep dog, the Briard, stem from similar ancestral stock, sharing the trait of double dewclaws on the hind legs. Both were used to herd sheep and cattle. Like the Beauceron, the Briard is found throughout northern France, and despite implications from its name, also did not come exclusively from the Brie region.

In 1809, Abbé Rozier wrote an article on these French herding dogs, in which he described the differences in type and used the terms Berger de Brie and Berger de Beauce.

In 1893, the veterinarian Paul Megnin differentiated between the long-haired Berger de la Brie and the short-haired Berger de Beauce. He defined the standard of the breed, with the assistance of M. Emmanuel Ball. In 1922, the Club des Amis du Beauceron was formed under the guidance of Dr. Megnin.

In 2008, the Beauceron made its debut in the Westminster Kennel Club Dog Show.

Working breed
A versatile breed, the Bas Rouge is used to both guard and herd sheep and cattle, it was very useful against wolves. The breed served in both world wars as a messenger dog, supply transport dog, land mine detection dog, search dog, police dog and rescue dog.

Description

Appearance

This breed stands 61 to 70 cm (24 to 27.5 inches) in height and weighs 30 to 45 kg (66 to 100 pounds) The Beauceron has a hard outer coat and a woolly undercoat that grows thick in cold weather, especially if the dog sleeps outdoors. Its standard colouring is black and tan (the latter colour referred to in French as rouge ecureuil, squirrel-red) or grey, black and tan called harlequin. Other colours, such as the once prevalent tawny, grey or grey/black, are now banned by the breed standard. The harlequin coats should have more black than gray with no white. In the black and tan dogs the tan markings should appear in two dots above the eyes, on the sides of the muzzle, fading off to the cheeks, but do not reach the underside of the ears. Also on the throat, under the tail and on the legs and the chest. Tan markings on the chest should appear as two spots but a chest plate is acceptable. Ear cropping is no longer allowed in most countries.

Although most breeds may or may not have dewclaws (many owners of other breeds remove dewclaws, especially if the dog is used for field and hunting), an important feature of the Beauceron is the double dewclaw. In order to be shown, a Beauceron must have double dewclaws that form well-separated "thumbs" with nails on each rear leg; anything less will result in disqualification from dog shows. The Beauceron’s double dew claws are connected by bone (unlike most breeds) and some dogs are even able to flex each one individually.  The Beauceron has no breed-specific health problems.

Character

The Beauceron is known in France as a guard dog, a helper around the farm (herding sheep or cattle), and/or a ring sport dog (primarily protection training). This athletic, healthy and long-lived breed has been bred to be intelligent, calm, gentle, and fearless. Adults are typically suspicious of strangers and are excellent natural guard dogs. On the other hand, they typically take their cue from their handlers when it comes to greeting strangers, and are neither sharp nor shy. They do best when raised within the family but they can sleep outside, the better to act as guards (their weatherproof coats make them ideal kennel users even in the coldest winters). They have a double smooth coat that is short. They are eager learners and can be trained to a high level. However, their physical and mental development is slow relative to other similar breeds (e.g. German and other large shepherds): they are not mentally or physically mature until the age of about three years, so their training should not be rushed. Several five- or ten-minute play-training exercises per day in the early years can achieve better results than long or rigorous training sessions.

See also
 Dogs portal
 List of dog breeds

References

Bibliography
Vous et votre beauceron (French), written by Pierre Boistel, published by Editions de l'Homme, January 8, 1991, 166 pages
Les Berger Francais (French), written by Philippe De Wailly and Alain Dupont, published by Solar, September 12, 1999, 
Beauceron, written by Meg Purnell Carpenter, published by Kennel Club Books, May, 2007, 160 pages
Le Beauceron (French), written by Monique Reverdy, published by Artémis, May 21, 2003, 144 pages

External links

FCI breeds
Herding dogs
Dog breeds originating in France
Rare dog breeds